Len Peterson (born 30 June 1946) is a former  Australian rules footballer who played with North Melbourne in the Victorian Football League (VFL).

Notes

External links 

Living people
1946 births
Australian rules footballers from Victoria (Australia)
North Melbourne Football Club players